

Wilhelm Söth (15 February 1903 – 6 July 1978) was a German general during World War II who commanded the 3rd Panzer Division.  He was a recipient of the Knight's Cross of the Iron Cross of Nazi Germany.

Awards 

 Knight's Cross of the Iron Cross on 28 November 1940 as Hauptmann and commander of the II./Artillerie-Regiment 56

References

Citations

Bibliography

 

1903 births
1978 deaths
Major generals of the German Army (Wehrmacht)
Recipients of the Gold German Cross
Recipients of the Knight's Cross of the Iron Cross
German prisoners of war in World War II held by the United States
Reichswehr personnel
People from Steinburg
Military personnel from Schleswig-Holstein